Ion Popa may refer to: 

 Ion Popa (1910s politician), member of the Moldovan Parliament (1917–1918)
 Ion Popa (1990s politician), member of the Moldovan Parliament (1990–1994)
 Ion Popa (Romanian politician), member of the Romanian Senate (2012–present), National Liberal Party (Romania)
 Ion Popa (rower), Australian rower
 Ion Popa (historian), contemporary historian